Megachile inimica (common name: hostile leaf-cutter bee) is a species of bee in the family Megachilidae. It was described by Cresson in 1872.

Distribution 
Megachile inimica is native to North and Central America, being found in Mexico, Guatemala and the southern United States.

References

inimica
Insects described in 1872